Gangoh is a town and a municipal board in Saharanpur district in the state of Uttar Pradesh, India.

History

According to the 1911 British publication The Imperial Gazetteer of India:

Gangoh is listed in the Ain-i-Akbari as a pargana under Saharanpur sarkar, producing a revenue of 2,029,032 dams for the imperial treasury and supplying a force of 2000 infantry and 300 cavalry. A community of Turkomans is mentioned as living in the town at the time.

Demographics
 India census, Gangoh had a population of 59,279. Males constitute 52.83% of the population and females 47.16%. Gangoh has an average literacy rate of 63.51%, lower than the national average of 74.04%.

Notable people 
 Abdul Quddus Gangohi
 Rashid Ahmad Gangohi
Mahmud Hasan Gangohi
 Pradeep Kumar, Indian politician and Member of Parliament

See also 

 Gangohi

References

External links
 Gangoh in Imperial Gazetteer of India, 1909

Cities and towns in Saharanpur district